Brazil participated at the 2018 Summer Youth Olympics in Buenos Aires, Argentina from 6 October to 18 October 2018. The Brazilian Olympic Committee selected a team of 79 athletes in 24 sports.

Medalists

Medals awarded to participants of mixed-NOC (combined) teams are represented in italics. These medals are not counted towards the individual NOC medal tally.

Archery

Brazil qualified one archer based on its performance at the 2017 World Archery Youth Championships. Brazil later qualified a female archer based on its performance at the American Continental Qualification Tournament.

Individual

Team

Athletics

 Boys' 100 m – Lucas Rodrigues da Silva
 Boys' 200 m – Lucas Vilar
 Boys' 400 m – Douglas Mendes
 Boys' 800 m – Pedro Tombolim de Souza
 Boys' 1500 m – Lucas Pinho Leite
 Boys' 110 m hurdles – Marcos Paulo Ferreira
 Boys' 400 m hurdles – Caio Teixeira
 Boys' 10 km walk – Bruno Lorenzetti Nascimento
 Boys' long jump – Adrian Vieira
 Boys' high jump – Elton Petronilho
 Boys' javelin throw – Guilherme Soares
 Boys' discus throw – Vitor Motin
 Girls' 100 m – Vitória Jardim
 Girls' 200 m – Letícia Lima
 Girls' 400 m – Erica Cavalheiro
 Girls' 400 m hurdles – Jéssica Moreira
 Girls' 2000 m steeplechase – Letícia Belo
 Girls' long jump – Lissandra Campos
 Girls' triple jump – Nerisnélia Sousa
 Girls' shot put – Rafaela de Sousa
 Girls' javelin throw – Bruna de Jesus

Badminton

Brazil qualified two players based on the Badminton Junior World Rankings.

Singles

Team

Basketball

Brazil qualified a boys' team based on the U18 3x3 National Federation Ranking.

 Boys' tournament – 1 team of 4 athletes

 Boys' tournament

Boys' dunk contest

Beach volleyball

Brazil qualified a girls' team based on their overall ranking from the South American Youth Tour.

 Boys' tournament – Gabriel Zuliani and João Pedro Moreira
 Girls' tournament – Ana Carolina dos Santos and Thamela Galil

Boxing

 Boys' team – 3 athletes

Canoeing

Brazil qualified one boat based on its performance at the 2018 World Qualification Event.

 Boys' C1 – Diego Nascimento

Cycling

Brazil qualified a girls' combined team based on its ranking in the Youth Olympic Games Junior Nation Rankings. They also qualified a mixed BMX racing team based on its ranking in the Youth Olympic Games BMX Junior Nation Rankings and two athletes in BMX freestyle based on its performance at the 2018 Urban Cycling World Championship.

 Girls' combined team – Amanda Kunkel and Bruna Saalfeld Elias
 Mixed BMX racing team – Vitor Marotta and Eduarda Bordignon
 Mixed BMX freestyle – Wesley Velho and Maitê Barreto

Diving

 Girls' events – Anna Lúcia dos Santos

Equestrian

Brazil qualified a rider based on its ranking in the FEI World Jumping Challenge Rankings.

 Individual Jumping – Philip Mattos Botelho

Futsal

Brazil qualified a boy team at the South American U-18 Championship.

Boys' tournament

Roster
Breno Rosa
Caio Valle
Françoar Rodrigues
Guilherme Sanches
João Victor Sena
Mateus Barbosa da Silva
Matheus Batista
Wesley de França
Vitor Henrique da Silva
Yuri Gavião

Group stage

Semifinals

Gold medal match

Gymnastics

Artistic
Brazil qualified two gymnasts based on its performance at the 2018 American Junior Championship.

 Boys' artistic individual all-around – Diogo Brajão Soares
 Girls' artistic individual all-around – Laura Leónardo

Rhythmic
Brazil qualified one gymnast based on its performance at the 2018 American Junior Championship.

 Girls' rhythmic individual all-around – Maria Eduarda Arakaki

Judo

 Boys' half lightweight – João Vitor dos Santos
 Girls' half heavyweight – Eduarda Rosa

Individual

Team

Modern pentathlon

Brazil qualified one pentathlete based on its performance at the Pan American Youth Olympic Games Qualifier.

 Girls' Individual – Maria Ieda Guimarães

Rowing

Brazil qualified one boat based on its performance at the Americas Qualification Regatta.

 Boys' single sculls – Marco Misasi

Sailing

Brazil qualified one boat based on its performance at the Central and South American IKA Twin Tip Qualifiers. Brazil later qualified two boats based on its performance at the Central and South American Techno 293+ Qualifiers.

 Boys' Techno 293+ – Guilherme Plentz
 Boys' IKA Twin Tip Racing – Manoel dos Santos Neto
 Girls' Techno 293+ – Giovana Prada

Swimming

 Boys' events – 4 athletes
 André Luiz de Souza
 Lucas Peixoto
 Murilo Sartori
 Vitor de Souza
 Girls' events – 4 athletes
 Ana Carolina Vieira
 Fernanda de Goeij
 Maria Pessanha
 Rafaela Raurich

Mixed

Taekwondo

 Girls' 55 kg – Sandy Macedo

Table tennis

Brazil qualified two table tennis players based on its performance at the Latin American Continental Qualifier.

 Boys' singles – Guilherme Teodoro
 Girls' singles – Bruna Takahashi

Tennis

Brazil qualified one tennis player based on the ITF World Junior Rankings.

Key

 r = Retired

Singles

Doubles

Triathlon

Brazil qualified two athletes based on its performance at the 2018 American Youth Olympic Games Qualifier.

Individual

Relay

Wrestling

Key:
  – Victory by Fall
  – Without any points scored by the opponent
  – With point(s) scored by the opponent
  – Without any points scored by the opponent
  – With point(s) scored by the opponent

References

Summer Youth Olympics
Brazil
2018